Non-Sinoxenic pronunciations are vocabularies borrowed from Chinese, but differ from Sinoxenic pronunciations in that:

The corresponding Chinese writing system is not borrowed alongside the pronunciation
The pronunciation did not arise from the attempt at adopting Chinese as the literary language
The borrowed vocabulary is not limited to Classical Chinese, but often includes modern and colloquial forms of Chinese

As such, non-Sinoxenic pronunciations are therefore loanwords in which the corresponding Chinese character is not adopted. These non-Sinoxenic pronunciations are thus most prominent in Asian languages in which cultural exchanges with Chinese culture occurred (e.g. Mongolian, Central Asian or Turkic languages), but the adoption of the Chinese writing system did not occur. This also includes non-Sinitic languages within China (e.g. Tibetan, Uyghur, Hani, Zhuang, Hmong). While the Sinoxenic model has traditionally held the limelight as the most distinctive and influential model for the borrowing of Chinese vocabulary, it is not the only model. For Sinoxenic languages, pronunciations are regarded as non-Sinoxenic if there is a mismatch between the vocabulary and the codified Sinoxenic pronunciation.

Mongolian

Timespan
Chronologically, Mongolian borrowing of Chinese vocabulary took place later than that of the Sinoxenic languages. In contrast to Sinoxenic vocabulary, Sino-Mongolian vocabulary is not the result of an attempt to adopt Chinese as the literary language or the adoption of the Chinese writing system as a whole. The majority of Mongolian loanwords from Chinese occurred in the last 800 years, sourced from Early, Middle, and Modern Mandarin as spoken in northern China, rather than Classical Chinese, as in the case of Sinospheric cultures.

Indirect and direct borrowing
Modes of borrowing are not uniform. Some vocabulary was borrowed indirectly, such as the term for writing, bichig (Mongolian Cyrillic: бичиг), which appears to have entered from Turkic in ancient times. Bichig derives from biir (Mongolian Cyrillic: бийр), which was adopted from Tibetan for writing instrument, pir (Tibetan: པིར), which itself is derived from the Chinese word for pen or writing brush.

In more recent times, most words have been borrowed directly. Some are starkly different from the Chinese pronunciation because of the long time for pronunciations to change or because of impressionistic auditory borrowing. One example is the word for window, tsonkh (Mongolian Cyrillic: цонх), from Chinese chuānghu. Similarly, the word for peace, taivang (Mongolian Cyrillic: тайван) is supposedly from Chinese tàipíng, which also means peace. Note that the traditional spelling (which equates to 'taibung') makes no attempt to reproduce the original vowel in 平 'píng'.

Although the traditional Mongolian script often tends to highlight the original Chinese pronunciation, the Cyrillic orthography, which spells words as they are pronounced, obscures the connection with Chinese. For instance, the syllable-final н in the Cyrillic script is pronounced /ŋ/ in Mongolia, thus neutralising the earlier distinction between /ŋ/ and /n/ in this position and further obscuring the regularity of relationships with Chinese. The distinction between /ŋ/ and /n/ is retained in Inner Mongolian dialects.

Examples
Note that the following examples are in the context of non-Sinoxenic vocabulary that exist in the Mongolian language.

The Sinoxenic languages of Japanese, Korean and Vietnamese are included for comparative purposes. Words that do not actually occur in the Sinoxenic languages are given in their Sinoxenic reading but are greyed out. The absence of these terms in Sinoxenic languages suggests that the borrowing of Chinese in Mongolian is attributed to a more recent form of a Sinitic language (such as Early Mandarin and Middle Mandarin), rather than Classical Chinese.

Korean

Sinoxenic vs non-Sinoxenic
Although Sino-Korean vocabulary dominates the spectrum of borrowed Chinese words, there are non-Sinoxenic words in Korean that are derived from Chinese. In such cases, the corresponding pronunciation for the Chinese character (hanja) does not match the borrowed vocabulary. Such loanwords most likely preserve a slightly different form of a Sinitic language from the one codified in Sino-Korean, thus making such words Chinese borrowings with a non-Sinoxenic pronunciation.

Examples

Brush
The Korean term for brush, but (붓), is derived from Middle Korean but (붇), which, in turn, is most likely derived from Early Middle Chinese. However, the Sino-Korean pronunciation for brush 筆 was codified (and is pronounced) as pil (필).

Ink
The Korean term for ink, meok (먹), is most likely derived from the Early Middle Chinese term for ink (墨), but actually, the Sino-Korean reading for 墨 was codified (and is pronounced) as muk (묵).

Horse
The Korean term for horse, mal (말), may have been derived from the Early Middle Chinese term for horse (馬), but actually, the Sino-Korean reading for 馬 was codified (and is pronounced) as ma (마). However, considering the Mongolic word for horse, mori, shows a trace of the l/r consonant in mal (Korean mal becomes mari in the nominative case), it is unlikely to be a Chinese loanword.

Old Chinese cognates
A few native Korean words closely resemble reconstructed pronunciations of Old Chinese that was spoken at least 2000 years ago in China. It's unclear if these words are borrowed from Old Chinese, or if Old Chinese borrowed these words from an ancient Koreanic language, or if these words are borrowed from another language (i.e. both Old Korean and Old Chinese borrowed from another language), or if these words are descended from a common proto language, or if these words are false cognates by mere chance. These words may not be the case of non-Sinoxenic pronunciations.

Examples

Wind
The Korean term for wind, baram (바람), may have been derived from the Old Chinese term for wind, /*prəm/ (風), but the Sino-Korean reading for 風 was codified (and is pronounced) as pung (풍).

Taste
The Korean term for taste, mat / mas- (맛), may have been derived from the Old Chinese term for taste, /*mɯds/ (味), but the Sino-Korean reading for 味 was codified (and is pronounced) as mi (미).

Bowl
The Korean term for bowl, geureut / geureus- (그릇), may have been derived from the Old Chinese term for container, /*kʰrɯds/ (器), but the Sino-Korean reading for 器 was codified (and is pronounced) as gi (기).

Comb
The Korean term for comb, bit / bis- (빗), may have been derived from the Old Chinese term for comb, /*bis/ (篦), but the Sino-Korean reading for 篦 was codified (and is pronounced) as bi (비).

River
The Korean term for river, garam (가람), may have been derived from the Old Chinese term for river, /*kroːŋ/ (江), but the Sino-Korean reading for 江 was codified (and is pronounced) as gang (강).

Bear
The Korean term for bear, gom (곰), may have been derived from the Old Chinese term for bear, /*ɢʷlɯm/ (熊), but the Sino-Korean reading for 熊 was codified (and is pronounced) as ung (웅).

Dragon
The Korean term for dragon, mireu (미르), may have been derived from the Old Chinese term for dragon, /*mroːŋ/ (龍), but the Sino-Korean reading for 龍 was codified (and is pronounced) as ryong (룡).

Street
The Korean term for street, geori (거리), may have been derived from the Old Chinese term for street, /*kreː/ (街), but the Sino-Korean reading for 街 was codified (and is pronounced) as ga (가).

Vietnamese
Some Sinologists such as Wang Li have attempted to classify words of Chinese origins into at least three categories: old or pre-Sino-Vietnamese vocabulary, Sino-Vietnamese vocabulary, and nativized Chinese vocabulary. Among the three, only Sino-Vietnamese vocabulary is considered to have a Sino-Xenic pronunciation, borrowed from Classical Chinese. The other two were introduced verbally through colloquial speech and are not as systematic, especially in terms of the lack of consistent correspondence between the tones of Vietnamese tones and the four tones of Middle Chinese. Some dictionaries, such as that of Thiều Chửu, may consider some pre-Sino-Vietnamese syllables to be Sino-Vietnamese.

Consequences of the multiple layers of borrowing are doublets and alternative readings:

Apart from these old borrowings, which are deeply integrated into Vietnamese, there are also phonetic borrowings of Yue or Cantonese origin, such as lì xì, lạp xưởng, xíu mại, xí ngầu, hầm bà lằng, and tả pín lù. These words were also borrowed through the spoken language and, unlike Sino-Vietnamese, also are not systematic. They are especially common in southern Vietnam, which has a significant population of Chinese, known as the Hoa ethnic group.

Other examples

Radish
The word "radish" in Chinese was attested in various forms since early Old Chinese. This is the source of the terms for "radish" and "turnip" in Sinoxenic languages like Korean (나복, nabok; or 라복, rabok) and it has also been adopted in a non-Sinoxenic way by many other languages in China and elsewhere in Asia. In Mongolian as spoken in Mongolia, its meaning has shifted to refer to a carrot, while radish is referred to as tsagaan luuvan.

See also 
 Chinese language
 Classical Chinese
 Standard Chinese
 List of English words of Chinese origin
 Sino-Xenic pronunciations

References

Chinese characters
Languages of East Asia
Middle Chinese